Pseudodexilla is a genus of flies in the family Tachinidae.

Distribution
China.

Species
 Pseudodexilla gui (Chao, 2002)

References

Dexiinae
Diptera of Asia
Monotypic Brachycera genera
Tachinidae genera